Ekeby may refer to:

Places

Sweden 
Ekeby, Bjuv, locality situated in Bjuv Municipality, Skåne County
Ekeby, Djursholm, locality situated in Danderyd Municipality, Stockholm County
Djursholms Ekeby, railway station on Roslagsbanan
Ekeby, Gotland, a settlement on the island of Gotland
Ekeby, Kumla, locality situated in Kumla Municipality, Örebro County
Ekeby, Skå socken, locality in Ekerö Municipality, Stockholm County
Ekeby, Södertälje, locality situated in Södertälje Municipality, Stockholm County,
Ekeby, Upplands Väsby, locality situated in Upplands Väsby Municipality, Stockholm County
Ekeby-Almby, locality situated in Örebro Municipality, Örebro County